Budhvayee is a village in Jagat Tehsil, Budaun district, Uttar Pradesh, India. The Budaun railway station is located at the distance of 4 kilometer from the village. Its village code is 128384. The village is administrated by Gram Panchayat.

References

Villages in Budaun district